Lawrence Baker may refer to:

Lawrence Baker (tennis), President of United States Tennis Association
Lawrence Baker (architect)
Lawrence Baker (fighter), see Raymond Daniels (martial artist)
Lawrence Baker (burgess) from List of members of the Virginia House of Burgesses

See also
Laurence Baker (disambiguation)
Larry Baker (disambiguation)
Laurie Baker (disambiguation)